van der Vlugt is a surname. Notable people with the surname include:

 Willem van der Vlugt (1732-1807), director of the Teylers Stichting
 Bartel Willem van der Vlugt (1763–1939), director of the Teylers Stichting and son of Willem van der Vlugt (1732).
 Willem van der Vlugt (1787-1849), director of the Teylers Stichting and son of Bartel Willem van der Vlugt (1763). 
 Vincent van der Vlugt (1802–1867), director of the Teylers Stichting and son of Bartel Willem van der Vlugt (1763). 
 Jan van der Vlugt (1823–1889), director of the Teylers Stichting and son of Willem van der Vlugt (1787).
Willem van der Vlugt (1853-1928), Dutch professor and parliamentarian 
 Jan Willem van der Vlugt (1890–1963), director of Teylers Stichting and son of Willem van der Vlugt (1853). 
 Leendert van der Vlugt (1894–1936), Dutch architect
 Abraham Jan Theodoor van der Vlugt (1894–1954), Dutch Minister of State and ambassador
 Fred van der Vlugt (1930–2002), Dutch journalist and brother of Bram van der Vlugt
 Bram van der Vlugt (1934), Dutch actor
 Marijne van der Vlugt (1965), Dutch musician and daughter of Bram van der Vlugt
 Simone van der Vlugt (1966), Dutch writer
 Rolf van der Vlugt (1981), Dutch kite surfer

Dutch-language surnames
Surnames of Dutch origin